The 10th Gold Cup was a motor race, run to Formula One rules, held on 21 September 1963 at Oulton Park, England. The race was run over 73 laps of the circuit, and was won by British driver Jim Clark in a Lotus 25.

This race was the Formula One debut for American driver Peter Revson, and the one and only Formula One start for Mike Beckwith.

Results

References
 "The Grand Prix Who's Who", Steve Small, 1995.
 "The Formula One Record Book", John Thompson, 1974.

International Gold Cup
International Gold Cup
Gold